I Spit on Your Grave III: Vengeance Is Mine is a 2015 American rape and revenge horror film, directed by R.D. Braunstein from a screenplay by Daniel Gilboy. It is the third installment in the series. Sarah Butler reprises her role as Jennifer Hills from the 2010 film I Spit on Your Grave (a remake of the 1978 original).

Plot
The film follows the life of Jennifer Hills, continuing her story from I Spit on Your Grave. After Jennifer survived her assault and exacted revenge on the men who raped her, she avoided conviction for her killing spree and settled in Los Angeles. She is no longer an aspiring writer and now devotes her time to working as an assault helpline operator and going to group counseling under the assumed name "Angela Jitrenka". She is also periodically shown attending personal therapy for her ordeal. Jennifer's scarring experience has left her highly distrustful and defensive towards most men, including her colleague Matthew, who has a seemingly genuine interest in her.

While in group counseling, Jennifer develops a bond with one of the girls in the group, Marla, who also does not trust men. The duo begin their own personal crusade by exacting poetic justice for victims of sexual assault. However, just as Jennifer begins to enjoy life, Marla dies under mysterious circumstances and no one is found guilty of her death. She becomes acquainted with Detective McDylan, an investigator into Marla's death who, however, fails to bring justice for Marla nor closure for Jennifer. Distraught and enraged at how the law could not help Marla nor the rape victims in her support group, she decides to get vengeance for them.

One by one, Jennifer stalks and lures the unpunished rapists to a private place to torture and kill them. Her first victim is Marla's estranged boyfriend and alleged murderer, soon followed by the stepfather of a teenage member of the group. After befriending Oscar, the only male member of the support group who lost his daughter to suicide after a sexual assault, Jennifer tracks down his daughter's rapist. The man manages to overpower her as she tries to attack him until he is shot dead by the police, whose attention Jennifer had been drawing through her actions. The police take Jennifer in for questioning, revealing their knowledge of her true identity in an attempt to obtain a confession. However, Oscar, who had grown sympathetic to Jennifer's cause, walks into the police station after slashing his own arms, and publicly admits to the murders before dying from his wounds.

No longer the prime suspect, Jennifer is released but stays under police watch as a person of interest. She has a nervous breakdown, becoming further disillusioned with society and no longer able to discern well-meaning men from sexual predators. Clad in a suggestive red dress in order to bait men, Jennifer leaves her home, evading the police watch. First, she unsuccessfully attacks Matthew and scares him away, then she tries to lure a local thug who had been harassing her. As Jennifer is about to kill him, she is shot and arrested by McDylan, who had been trailing her the entire time.

It is now revealed Jennifer's personal therapy sessions were part of her mandatory treatment following a two-year sentence for attempted murder, lacking evidence of the murders that she actually committed. After completing the final session before her release, Jennifer leaves the doctor's office and switches the "therapist" sign on the door to read "the rapist". She is then attacked by two inmates, whom she kills, before killing her therapist who had left the room to stop it, but this is revealed to be a daydream, indicating that Jennifer's fantasies of killing all rapists are not over. This shows that this was merely another vision, as she walks down the hallway completely clean.

Cast

Box office
The film opened in Russia and Ukraine on October 1, 2015. Russia debuted the movie at the number 11 with a total of $44,021 from 81 screens. Ukraine fared better with a fifth place opening and a weekend total of $18,603 from 48 screens. After a three-week run in Russia and Ukraine, the cumulative totals were $111,089 and $33,331 respectively.

References

External links
 
 

2015 horror films
2015 crime thriller films
2015 horror thriller films
American horror thriller films
American crime thriller films
American serial killer films
2010s exploitation films
2010s feminist films
American sequel films
American independent films
American films about revenge
CineTel Films films
American rape and revenge films
Films set in Los Angeles
Films about violence against women
Films about post-traumatic stress disorder
I Spit on Your Grave (film series)
American feminist films
2010s English-language films
2010s American films